The Mulberry garden, originally Morušová zahrada in Czech, is a cottage garden in the Czech Republic, situated in the Czech Central Uplands in the village Režný Újezd,  northwest of the town Lovosice. The garden was established in 2014 by local gardeners admiring the English cottage garden style. Apart from different kinds of plants such as perennial plants, English historical roses, Czech roses, annual plants, and bulbs, several uncommon fruit trees are grown, especially various mulberry varieties. Mulberry garden is located along the green tourist track to Boreč hill in the grounds of former Gentlemen's farm, house no. 2.

The nearby hill Borec is a unique geological and botanical location famous for its hydrothermal vents, micro-exhalations and specific fauna and flora.

Specimen 

Mulberry trees:
Morus alba
Morus Alba "Dolce Vita"
Morus Alba "King of White"
Morus Alba pendula - weeping mulberry
Morus alba var. nigra Morus nigra
Morus Alba "Shin-Tso"
Morus macroura - Himalayan mulberry Shahtoot - several specimen
Morus Nigra "Bzenecká" - Czech variety
Morus Nigra "English" - from the UK
Morus Nigra "Pakistan Giant"
Morus Nigra "Persian Everbearing"
Morus Nigra "Siyah Sahdut"
Morus Nigra "Wellington"
Morus Tyrnaviensis - Slovak variety, a cross between Morus rubra and Morus nigra

Other trees:
Almond trees - "Zora", "Supernova", "Vama", "Sadkoploda krajova"
Apple tree "Malus Domestica"
Apricot trees - unknown
Dogwood Cornelian cherry - "Bolestraszycki", "Swietljaczok", "Szafer", "Vydubeckyj" - Polish and Ukrainian varieties
Cherry "Bigarreau Coeur de Pigeon" - an old rare variety
Cherry "Lapins"
Fig tree "Brown Turkey"
Hazelnut trees - several varieties
Plum tree - Prunus Domestica - Czech variety
Wallnut tree

References

See also
Mulberry (disambiguation)

Gardens in the Czech Republic